Elizabeth Van Volkenburgh (born July 2, 1952)  is a Professor of Plant Science at the University of Washington. She has served as the President of the society for Plant Signaling and Behavior.

Early life and education 
Van Volkenburgh was born to Robert Heber and Jean Brown in Fort Sill, Oklahoma. Van Volkenburgh became interested in biology during high school. She studied botany at Duke University, and earned her Bachelor's degree in 1973.  She was most interested in plant physiology and biochemical function. She nearly majored in economics because her mother recommended education that might lead to a paying job like being a lawyer or economist, but found that she learned better the life sciences. She also chose plant biology to avoid the stress brought to bear on the topics by premedical students at her school. After graduating, Van Volkenburgh worked as a technician in the Smithsonian Institution Botany Department and at the Duke University Phytotron. Van Volkenburgh earned her doctoral degree at the University of Washington, where she investigated how light regulates the rate of leaf expansion. She spent her early career in University of Illinois at Urbana–Champaign and moved to Lancaster University as a NATO Fellow for a postdoctoral fellowship.

Research and career 
In 1987 Van Volkenburgh joined the University of Washington as an Assistant Professor of Botany. She worked closely with Reini Stettler, Toby Bradshaw and Tom Hinckley. She has led the Plant Growth Lab at the University of Washington for over thirty years. Her work considers the physiological regulation of leaf expansion in crop plants such as beans, corn and tomato. Leaf growth physiology relies on a range of environmental cues. She has studied plant growth and photobiology, as well as drought stress and genetic variation. She has worked on the rate of growth and drought tolerance in the common bean as well as in corn. Her lab has also worked on the physiological relevance leaf margin shape in tomato, and the contribution of adventitious roots in canopy soils on branches of old doug fir and big-leaf maple trees. 
Van Volkenburgh has been part of the American Association for the Advancement of Science ADVANCE program.

Selected publications

References 

American women botanists
20th-century American botanists
21st-century American botanists
1952 births
Living people
20th-century American women scientists
21st-century American women scientists